Lindenberg im Allgäu (Low Alemannic: Lindaberg) is the second largest town of the district of Lindau in Bavaria, Germany. It is an acknowledged air health resort.

History
The town was first mentioned in 857, when two nobles donated in "Lintiberc" to the monastery of St. Gall.

In 1570, the Austrian branch of the House of Habsburg acquired the demesne of the heirless sovereignty of Altenburg, including Lindenberg, back then a consolidation of about 70 farms.

The city fell to Bavaria in 1805 as part of Napoleon's Treaty of Pressburg.

As early as 1656 straw hats from Lindenberg were sold by peddling and in markets. In 1755, the production and shipping of straw hats became organized. The hat industry has declined in recent decades and now has hardly any economic importance. Hat making is still remembered today in an annual "Huttag" ("hat day") as well as in a hat museum.

Education
Lindenberg has a primary school, a Mittelschule, a Realschule and a Gymnasium. The Humboldt-Institut for German as a foreign language runs a boarding school for international students. The Bavarian Red Cross runs vocational schools for Nursing and Elderly Care in Lindenberg.

Geographical Features

Waldsee
The Waldsee is one of the highest moors in Germany at 765.4 m (2511.2 ft). It was initially established as a fish pond in the Middle Ages, but today it is used as a swimming area.

Economy
Important employers are:
Liebherr-Aerospace Lindenberg GmbH
 Mayser GmbH & Co.KG

International relations

Lindenberg im Allgäu is twinned with:
 1999: Vallauris-Golfe-Juan 
 2003: Saline, Michigan

Notable people from Lindenberg
Heike Allgayer (born 1969), physician and molecular biologist
Arthur Burkhard (1928–2020), picture journalist
Anton Fehr (1881–1954), agricultural scientist and politician
Otto Geßler (1875–1955), politician and president of the German Red Cross
Klaus Gietinger (born 1955), film director and script writer
Stephan Huber (born 1952), sculptor
Markus Miller (born 1982), football goalkeeper
Johann Georg Specht (1720–1803), architect
Werner Specht (born 1942), painter and chansonnier
Tobias Steinhauser (born 1972), cyclist

References

Lindau (district)